Grace Chu is a Hong Kong international lawn bowler.

Bowls career
Chu was selected as part of the five woman team by Hong Kong for the 2008 World Outdoor Bowls Championship, which was held in Christchurch, New Zealand.

She won a triples gold medal (with Camilla Leung and Elizabeth Li), at the 2005 Asia Pacific Bowls Championships, held in Melbourne. She then followed this up with two bronze medals at the next two editions of the Championships.

References

Hong Kong female bowls players
Living people
Year of birth missing (living people)